The Cape Provinces of South Africa is a biogeographical area used in the World Geographical Scheme for Recording Plant Distributions (WGSRPD). It is part of the WGSRPD region 27 Southern Africa. The area has the code "CPP". It includes the South African provinces of the Eastern Cape, the Northern Cape and the Western Cape, together making up most of the former Cape Province.

The area includes the Cape Floristic Region, the smallest of the six recognised floral kingdoms of the world, an area of extraordinarily high diversity and endemism, home to more than 9,000 vascular plant species, of which 69 percent are endemic.

See also
 
 Northern Provinces

References

Bibliography

 

 
Biogeography